Irakli Menagarishvili (born May 18, 1951) is a Georgian politician and diplomat.
    
Menagarishvili was born in Tbilisi, capital of Georgia (then the Georgian SSR, Soviet Union). 
 
Menagarishvili graduated from Tbilisi State Medical Institute in 1974. During the presidency of Eduard Shevardnadze, he served as Minister of Foreign Affairs of Georgia, from 1995 to 2003. Past positions have included Deputy Prime Minister (1993-1995), Minister of Public Health (1986-1991, 1992-1993) and Coordinator of the International Humanitarian Assistance at the State Council of the Republic of Georgia (1992).

References

External links 
SRC - Irakli Menagarishvili at The Strategic Research Center

Government ministers of Georgia (country)
Foreign Ministers of Georgia
1951 births
Living people
Politicians from Tbilisi
Tbilisi State Medical University alumni
20th-century politicians from Georgia (country)
21st-century politicians from Georgia (country)